Ugotowani is a TVN television programme shown in Poland.  It was the Polish version of the Channel 4's Come Dine with Me. The show has four amateur chefs competing against each other hosting a dinner party for the other contestants. Each competitor then rates the host's performance with the winner winning a 5,000 zł cash prize. An element of comedy is added to the show by a comedian, who provides a dry and "bitingly sarcastic" narration.

Series summary

Series Guide

Series 1: Autumn 2010 - Sunday 5.00 p.m.

Series 2: Autumn 2011 - Sunday 6.00 p.m.

Series 3: Autumn 2012 - Sunday 6.00 p.m.

Series 4: Spring 2013 - Sunday 6.00 p.m.

Series 5: Autumn 2013 - Sunday 6.00 p.m.

Series 6: Spring 2014 - Sunday 6.00 p.m.

Series 7: Autumn 2014 - Monday-Thursday 8:50 p.m & Sunday 5:00 p.m/6:00 p.m (Best Of)

Series 8: Spring 2015 - Monday-Thursday 8:50 p.m & Sunday 5:00 p.m/6:00 p.m (Best Of)

Series 9: Autumn 2015 - Sunday 6.00 p.m.

Series 10: Spring 2016 - Sunday 6.00 p.m.

2010 in Polish television
2011 in Polish television
2012 in Polish television
2013 in Polish television
2010 Polish television series debuts
Come Dine With Me
TVN (Polish TV channel) original programming
Polish television series based on British television series
Polish reality television series